Georg August Thilesen (20 December 1837 - 20 December 1917) was the Norwegian  lawyer and elected official. He served as mayor of Drammen 1883–1884, Minister of the Interior 1888-1889 and 1898–1899, member of the Council of State Division in Stockholm 1899–1900, and Minister of Finance in 1900.

References

1837 births
1917 deaths
Government ministers of Norway
Ministers of Finance of Norway
19th-century Norwegian lawyers
Mayors of places in Norway
People from Østfold